Intissar or Intisar or Entissar means victory, triumph and is an Arabic female given name. Notable people with the name include:

Intissar 
 Intissar Abdulmomen, Egyptian writer and novelist
 Intissar al-Wazir (1941), member of the Palestinian Legislative Council
 Intissar Amer (1956), current First Lady of Egypt

Intisar 
 Intisar Abioto (1986), artists from Portland, Oregon
 Intisar Abu Amara (1958), Palestinian politician
 Intisar Al-Sharrah (1962–2021), Kuwaiti actress
 Intisar el-Zein Soughayroun (1950), Sudanese archaeologist
 Intisar Salem Al Ali Al Sabah (1964), Kuwaiti social entrepreneur, philanthropist, author, film producer and columnist

Arabic feminine given names